Grant Township is one of ten townships in Newton County, Indiana, United States. As of the 2010 census, its population was 1,189 and it contained 548 housing units.

History
Grant Township was founded in 1865, and named for Ulysses S. Grant.

Geography

Cities, towns, villages
 Goodland

Unincorporated towns
 Perkins at 
(This list is based on USGS data and may include former settlements.)

Cemeteries
The township contains these two cemeteries: Goodland and Mount Calvary.

Major highways
  U.S. Route 24

Education
 South Newton School Corporation

Grant Township is served by the Goodland-Grant Township Public Library.

Political districts
 Indiana's 1st congressional district
 State House District 15
 State Senate District 6

References
 
 United States Census Bureau 2008 TIGER/Line Shapefiles
 IndianaMap

External links
 Indiana Township Association
 United Township Association of Indiana
 City-Data.com page for Grant Township

Townships in Newton County, Indiana
Townships in Indiana